The Trans-Baikal Bald Mountain tundra ecoregion (WWF ID: PA1112) covers the high-altitude peak zones above the treeline in a series of mountain ranges that stretch from the northern reaches of Lake Baikal to the western coastal ranges of the Okhotsk Sea. Floral communities are those of mountain tundra, with bare rock or permafrost under layers of moss and lichen. Because the ecoregion is aligned along a common latitude, it acts as a route for the transmission of species across Siberia. The ecoregion is in the Palearctic realm and the tundra biome.

Location and description 
The ecoregion stretches almost 1,800 km from west to east, forming a patchwork of sections that are mostly above  in a series of mountain ranges from Lake Baikal to the Okhotsk Sea. This string of high-altitude zones roughly follows 56 degrees north latitude, and much of the tundra climate is due to altitude zoning. The individual mountain ranges include the Stanovoy Range and the Dzhugdzhur Mountains.

Climate 
The region has a Subarctic climate (Koppen classification Dwc). Mean precipitation in the Trans-baikal bald mountain tundra region is about 121 mm/year.

Flora and fauna 
In general, the high peaks are bare rock at their highest, most windswept points.  At lower elevations, moss and lichen form mats on the thin soil and permafrost.  Mammals in this zone include marmots, moose, and musk deer.

Protections 
There are several significant nationally protected area that reach into this ecoregion:

 Vitim Nature Reserve, northeast of Lake Baikal, in the Kodar Mountains,
 Bureya Nature Reserve, north of the Bureya Range, with high peaks and lakes that feed the lower Amur River, and
 Dzhugdzur Nature Reserve, on the far eastern edge of the ecoregion, and which transitions into the East Siberian taiga ecoregion at lower elevations.

References 

Ecoregions of Russia
Palearctic ecoregions
Tundra ecoregions